Bodin is a surname. Notable people with the surname include:

 Astrid Bodin (1903–1961), Swedish actress
 Billy Bodin (born 1992), Welsh football player
 Chris Douglas (born 1974), also known as "Wooli Bodin", American musician
 Claude Bodin (born 1952), member of the National Assembly of France
 Constantine Bodin (fl. 1081–1101), medieval ruler
 Don Bodin, American composer, songwriter, and music producer
 Edward Longstreet Bodin (1894–1983), American mystery writer and founder of the "Spiritual Party" 
 Étienne Soulange-Bodin (1774–1846), French agronomist and army officer
 Geneviève Bodin (1923–2021), better known as Geneviève Asse, Breton painter and engraver
 Jean Bodin (1530–1596), 16th-century French jurist and political philosopher
 Joseph Bodin de Boismortier (1689–1755), French baroque composer
 Kévin Bodin (born 1987), French football player
 Lars Gunnar Bodin (1935–2021), Swedish electronic music pioneer
 Martin Bodin (1903–1976), Swedish cinematographer
 Paul Bodin (born 1964), Welsh football player and coach
 Simone Micheline Bodin (1925–2015), French fashion model
 Tomas Bodin, Swedish keyboard player
 Yannick Bodin (born 1942), member of the Senate of France

See also
Bolden (name), given name and surname
Boldin, surname

French-language surnames
Swedish-language surnames